Heather Hendrickson is a microbiologist and a Senior Lecturer in the School of Biological Sciences at the University of Canterbury in Christchurch, New Zealand. She previously worked at Massey University, Auckland, New Zealand. Her research is focussed on the evolution of bacterial cell shape, and the discovery of bacteriophages that can attack antibiotic-resistant bacteria and the bee disease American foulbrood.

Life and career

Hendrickson was born in Salt Lake City, Utah, and moved to California as a young child; she describes herself as "obsessed with birds and bugs from a really young age." Her family members were conservative Church of Jesus Christ of Latter-Day Saints (Mormons) who did not believe in evolution; in her household there were rules such as "no drinking alcohol, coffee or tea, no popular music and no one smokes. Girls had to wear skirts to church and we were trained as a kid to be a homemaker." However, by the time she went to graduate school in Pittsburgh, she had become an atheist.

Hendrickson graduated from the University of Utah in 2000 with a Bachelor of Science, then completed a PhD in Molecular, Cellular and Developmental Biology at the University of Pittsburgh in 2008. She spent three years as a postdoctoral researcher at the Biochemistry Department of the University of Oxford, as an HFSP Long-Term Fellow, researching variability of DNA replication in Escherichia coli. Hendrickson moved to the Albany campus of Massey University as a lecturer in evolutionary genetics, rising to Senior Lecturer in Molecular Bioscience in 2015. She moved from Massey University to become a Senior Lecturer at the University of Canterbury in 2022. She is currently the president of the New Zealand Microbiological Society.

Research 
Hendrickson studies microbial evolution, specifically bacteriophages and genomics of bacteria. Her research has two main components: transitions in bacterial evolution, including the evolution of cell shape, and the discovery of new bacteriophages, especially ones which could counter antibiotic-resistant bacteria. She uses a combination of experimental evolution, cell biology, and bacterial genomics.

Bacterial evolution 
Analysis of the evolutionary tree of bacteria suggests the ancestral bacterium was rod-shaped. Hendrickson studies the way bacteria like Deinococcus, Staphylococcus, and Streptococcus bacteria evolved a spherical shape. All three of these genera lack the gene for the protein MreB (the equivalent of actin in eukaryotes) which controls the width of rod-shaped bacteria. Normally deleting this gene kills the bacterium, but Hendrickson's lab has evolved a rod-like bacterial strain that can withstand the deletion of the MreB gene, enabling them to study how a spherical shape has evolved.

To study the process of endosymbiosis, where one single-celled organism captures and incorporates another into its body, Hendrickson and her collaborators ran 10,000-generation experiments with mixtures of amoebae and their bacterial prey, to monitor possible collaborative partnerships that formed and sequence their genomes.

Bacteriophages 
Hendrickson's lab works on discovering and understanding the biology of bacteriophages that attack the bacteria Pseudomonas, Lactocococus, Mycobacterium, and Paenibacillus. In collaboration with the American Foulbrood Management Agency, they are currently investigating phages that kill the bacterium Paenibacillus larvae, which causes American foulbrood (AFB) disease in honey bees. In New Zealand, antibiotics may not be used to control AFB because they leave residues in the honey, so hives are usually destroyed instead. The Hendrickson lab screens soil samples collected by beekeepers from beneath healthy hives, looking for bacteriophages that could be used to prevent AFB infection.

Hendrickson and her colleagues also work on discovering new bacteriophages that might be effective against antibiotic-resistant bacteria. Six of her students  discovered bacteriophages that could kill Mycobacterium smegmatis, a relative of the tuberculosis bacterium M. tuberculosis, which can infect the lungs of vulnerable people such as cystic fibrosis sufferers.

Selected works

References

External links
 
Hendrickson Lab website
University of Canterbury Profile 

Living people
American expatriates in New Zealand
American women academics
Year of birth missing (living people)
Academic staff of the Massey University
American microbiologists
University of Pittsburgh alumni
University of Utah alumni
American expatriates in England
American atheists
Former Latter Day Saints
Lecturers
Medical scholars of the University of Oxford
21st-century American women